Modern Standard Arabic (MSA) or Modern Written Arabic (MWA), terms used mostly by linguists, is the variety of standardized, literary Arabic that developed in the Arab world in the late 19th and early 20th centuries; occasionally, it also refers to spoken Arabic that approximates this written standard. MSA is the language used in literature, academia, print and mass media, law and legislation, though it is generally not spoken as a first language, similar to Contemporary Latin. It is a pluricentric standard language taught throughout the Arab world in formal education, differing significantly from many vernacular varieties of Arabic that are commonly spoken as mother tongues in the area; these are only partially mutually intelligible with both MSA and with each other depending on their proximity in the Arabic dialect continuum.

Many linguists consider MSA to be distinct from Classical Arabic (CA) – the written language prior to the mid-19th century – although there is no agreed moment at which CA turned into MSA. There are also no agreed set of linguistic criteria which distinguish CA from MSA, however MSA differs most markedly in that it either synthesizes words from Arabic roots (such as  car or  steamship) or adapts words from foreign languages (such as  workshop or  Internet) to describe industrial and post-industrial life.

Native speakers of Arabic generally do not distinguish between "Modern Standard Arabic" and "Classical Arabic" as separate languages; they refer to both as  meaning "the eloquent Arabic". They consider the two forms to be two historical periods of one language.

History

Classical Arabic 

Classical Arabic, also known as Quranic Arabic (although the term is not entirely accurate), is the language used in the Quran as well as in numerous literary texts from Umayyad and Abbasid times (7th to 9th centuries). Many Muslims study Classical Arabic in order to read the Quran in its original language. It is important to note that written Classical Arabic underwent fundamental changes during the early Islamic era, adding dots to distinguish similarly written letters, and adding the tashkīl (diacritical markings that guide pronunciation) by Abu al-Aswad al-Du'ali, Al-Khalil ibn Ahmad al-Farahidi, and other scholars. It was the lingua franca across the Middle East, North Africa, and the Horn of Africa during classic times and in Andalusia before classic times.

Emergence of Modern Standard Arabic 
Napoleon's campaign in Egypt and Syria (1798–1801) is generally considered to be the starting point of the modern period of the Arabic language, when the intensity of contacts between the Western world and Arabic culture increased. Napoleon introduced a printing press in Egypt in 1798; it briefly disappeared after the French departure in 1801, but Muhammad Ali Pasha, who also sent students to Italy, France and England to study military and applied sciences in 1809, reintroduced it a few years later in Boulaq, Cairo. (Previously, Arabic-language presses had been introduced locally in Lebanon in 1610, and in Aleppo, Syria in 1702). The first Arabic printed newspaper was established in 1828: the bilingual Turkish-Arabic Al-Waqa'i' al-Misriyya had great influence in the formation of Modern Standard Arabic. It was followed by Al-Ahram (1875) and al-Muqattam (1889). The Western–Arabic contacts and technological developments in especially the newspaper industry indirectly caused the revival of Arabic literature, or Nahda, in the late 19th and early 20th century. Another important development was the establishment of Arabic-only schools in reaction against the Turkification of Arabic-majority areas under Ottoman rule.

Current situation 
Modern Standard Arabic (MSA) is the literary standard across the Middle East, North Africa and Horn of Africa, and is one of the six official languages of the United Nations. Most printed material by the Arab League—including most books, newspapers, magazines, official documents, and reading primers for small children—is written in MSA. "Colloquial" Arabic refers to the many regional dialects derived from Classical Arabic spoken daily across the region and learned as a first language, and as second language if people speak other languages native to their particular country. They are not normally written, although a certain amount of literature (particularly plays and poetry, including songs) exists in many of them.

Literary Arabic (MSA) is the official language of all Arab League countries and is the only form of Arabic taught in schools at all stages. Additionally, some members of religious minorities recite prayers in it, as it is considered the literary language. Translated versions of the Bible which are used in Arabic-speaking countries are mostly written in MSA, aside from Classical Arabic. Muslims recite prayers in it; revised editions of numerous literary texts from Umayyad and Abbasid times are also written in MSA.

The sociolinguistic situation of Arabic in modern times provides a prime example of the linguistic phenomenon of diglossiathe use of two distinct varieties of the same language, usually in different social contexts. This diglossic situation facilitates code-switching in which a speaker switches back and forth between the two dialects of the language, sometimes even within the same sentence. People speak MSA as a third language if they speak other languages native to a country as their first language and colloquial Arabic dialects as their second language. Modern Standard Arabic is also spoken by people of Arab descent outside the Arab world when people of Arab descent speaking different dialects communicate to each other. As there is a prestige or standard dialect of vernacular Arabic, speakers of standard colloquial dialects code-switch between these particular dialects and MSA.

Classical Arabic is considered normative; a few contemporary authors attempt (with varying degrees of success) to follow the syntactic and grammatical norms laid down by classical grammarians (such as Sibawayh) and to use the vocabulary defined in classical dictionaries (such as the Lisan al-Arab).

However, the exigencies of modernity have led to the adoption of numerous terms which would have been mysterious to a classical author, whether taken from other languages (e. g.  film) or coined from existing lexical resources (e. g.  hātif  "caller" > "telephone"). Structural influence from foreign languages or from the vernaculars has also affected Modern Standard Arabic: for example, MSA texts sometimes use the format "A, B, C and D" when listing things, whereas Classical Arabic prefers "A and B and C and D", and subject-initial sentences may be more common in MSA than in Classical Arabic. For these reasons, Modern Standard Arabic is generally treated separately in non-Arab sources. Speakers of Modern Standard Arabic do not always observe the intricate rules of Classical Arabic grammar. Modern Standard Arabic principally differs from Classical Arabic in three areas: lexicon, stylistics, and certain innovations on the periphery that are not strictly regulated by the classical authorities. On the whole, Modern Standard Arabic is not homogeneous; there are authors who write in a style very close to the classical models and others who try to create new stylistic patterns. Add to this regional differences in vocabulary depending upon the influence of the local Arabic varieties and the influences of foreign languages, such as French in Africa and Lebanon or English in Egypt, Jordan, and other countries.

As MSA is a revised and simplified form of Classical Arabic, MSA in terms of lexicon omitted the obsolete words used in Classical Arabic. As diglossia is involved, various Arabic dialects freely borrow words from MSA. This situation is similar to Romance languages, wherein scores of words were borrowed directly from formal Latin (most literate Romance speakers were also literate in Latin); educated speakers of standard colloquial dialects speak in this kind of communication.

Reading out loud in MSA for various reasons is becoming increasingly simpler, using less strict rules compared to CA, notably the inflection is omitted, making it closer to spoken varieties of Arabic. It depends on the speaker's knowledge and attitude to the grammar of Classical Arabic, as well as the region and the intended audience.

Pronunciation of native words, loanwords, and foreign names in MSA is loose. Names can be pronounced or even spelled differently in different regions and by different speakers. Pronunciation also depends on the person's education, linguistic knowledge, and abilities. There may be sounds used which are missing in Classical Arabic but exist in colloquial varieties.

Phonology

Consonants

Vowels 

 Short  can also have different realizations, i.e. . Sometimes with one value for each vowel in both short and long lengths or two different values for each short and long lengths. 
 In some other particular dialects  and  completely become  and  respectively.
 Unstressed final long  are most often shortened or reduced:  → ,  → ,  → .

Differences between Modern Standard Arabic and Classical Arabic 
While there are differences between Modern Standard Arabic and Classical Arabic, Arabic speakers tend to find these differences unimportant, and generally refer to both by the same name: al-ʻArabīyah al-Fuṣḥā ('the eloquent Arabic').

Differences in syntax 
MSA tends to use simplified sentence structures and drop more complicated ones commonly used in Classical Arabic. Some examples include reliance on verb sentences instead of noun phrases and semi-sentences, as well as avoiding phrasal adjectives and accommodating feminine forms of ranks and job titles.

Differences in terminology 
Because MSA speech occurs in fields with novel concepts, including technical literature and scientific domains, the need for terms that did not exist in the time of CA has led to coining new terms. Arabic Language Academies had attempted to fulfill this role during the second half of the 20th century with neologisms with Arab roots, but MSA typically borrows terms from other languages to coin new terminology.

Differences in pronunciation 
In addition, MSA normally does not use diacritics (tashkīl) unless there is a need for disambiguation or instruction, unlike the CA found in Quran and Hadith scriptures, which are texts that demand strict adherence to exact wording. MSA also has taken on some punctuation marking from other languages.

Regional variants 
MSA is loosely uniform across the Middle East as it is based on the convention of Arabic speakers rather than being a regulated language which rules are followed (that is despite the number of academies regulating Arabic). It can be thought of as being in a continuum between CA (the regulated language described in grammar books) and the spoken vernaculars while leaning much more to CA in its written form than its spoken form.

Regional variations exist due to influence from the spoken vernaculars. People who speak MSA also mix vernacular and Classical in pronunciation, words, and grammatical forms. Classical/vernacular mixing in formal writing can also be found (e.g., in some Egyptian newspaper editorials); others are written in Modern Standard/vernacular mixing, including entertainment news.

Speakers 

The Egyptian writer and journalist, Cherif Choubachy wrote in a critical book, that more than half of the Arabic speaking world are not Arabs and that more than 50% of Arabs in the Arabic speaking world use Literary Arabic.

According to Ethnologue there are no native speakers of Modern Standard Arabic, but a total of 273,989,700 second language speakers in the world. They add that: "In most Arab countries only the well-educated have adequate proficiency in Modern Standard Arabic."  In Morocco, Algeria, and Tunisia, French is the language of higher education in science, technology, engineering, and mathematics (STEM), while in the Gulf region it's English.

Several reports mentioned that the use of Modern Standard Arabic was on the decline in the Arab world, especially in Gulf countries such as the United Arab Emirates where foreign workers make up more than 80% of the population and where English has become the lingua franca of commerce, media, and education. Content in Modern Standard Arabic is also under-represented online and in literature.

According to the 2017 Arab Youth Survey done by polling firm PSB Insights, 54% of respondents (young urban Arabs aged 18 to 24) agreed with the statement: "On a daily basis, I use English more than Arabic." They were 68% in GCC countries. The New York Times reported that most Arab students of Northwestern University in Qatar and Georgetown University in Qatar did not have "professional proficiency" in Modern Standard Arabic.

Grammar

Common phrases

See also 

 Arabic language
 Varieties of Arabic
 Arabic literature
 Arab League
 Geographic distribution of Arabic
 Dictionary of Modern Written Arabic
 Arabic English Lexicon
 Diglossia
 Arabic phonology
 Help:IPA/Arabic
 Pluricentric language

Notes

References

Further reading 
 
 Holes, Clive (2004). Modern Arabic: Structures, Functions, and Varieties. Georgetown University Press.

External links

 Modern Standard Arabic
 Online Classical Arabic Reader
 Learn Arabic WikiBook
 Yamli Editor - The Smart Arabic Keyboard (with automatic conversions and dictionary for better selections)
 Rule-based analysis and generation of Modern Standard Arabic
 

Standard languages
Arabic languages
Diglossia
Verb–subject–object languages